Collinsia rattanii is a species of flowering plant in the plantain family known by the common name sticky blue-eyed Mary. It is native to the coniferous forests of the Pacific Northwest of the United States from Washington to northern California. It is an annual herb growing up to 40 centimeters tall with linear leaves rolled under along the edges. The leaves are hairy on the upper surface and hairless and purple-tinted underneath. The inflorescence is coated in sticky glandular hairs. It has a series of nodes from which arise one to five flowers each on pedicels. The flower is only 4 to 8 millimeters long, with two mostly white upper lobes and three mostly purple lower lobes.

External links
Jepson Manual Treatment
Photo gallery

rattanii
Flora of California
Flora of Oregon
Flora of Washington (state)
Flora of the Klamath Mountains
Natural history of the California Coast Ranges
Flora of the West Coast of the United States
Flora without expected TNC conservation status